Marián Andel (born 10 September 1950, in Modra) is a Slovak politician.  He was elected to the National Council of the Slovak Republic under the Slovak National Party in the terms 1994-1998 and 1998 -2002. In the parliamentary elections in 2006 he was a candidate for SLNKO.

References

This article was initially translated from the Slovak Wikipedia.

1950 births
Living people
People from Modra
Members of the National Council (Slovakia) 1994-1998
Members of the National Council (Slovakia) 1998-2002